Alberto Radi (10 December 1919 – 13 July 1989) was an Italian rower who competed in the 1948 Summer Olympics.

He was born in Trieste. In 1948 he was the coxswain of the Italian boat which won the silver medal in the coxed pair event.

References

External links
 Alberto Radi's profile at the International Genealogical Database
 
 

1919 births
1989 deaths
Italian male rowers
Coxswains (rowing)
Olympic rowers of Italy
Rowers at the 1948 Summer Olympics
Olympic silver medalists for Italy
Sportspeople from Trieste
Olympic medalists in rowing
Medalists at the 1948 Summer Olympics